Semecarpus obovatus is a species of plant in the family Anacardiaceae. It is endemic to Sri Lanka. The specific epithet was originally spelt obovata.

References

Endemic flora of Sri Lanka
obovatus
Vulnerable plants
Taxonomy articles created by Polbot